The Sherwood–Carievale Border Crossing connects the towns of Sherwood, North Dakota and Carievale, Saskatchewan on the Canada–United States border. It is reached by North Dakota Highway 28 on the American side and Saskatchewan Highway 8 on the Canadian side.

History  

Border inspection services were first conducted at this crossing in 1930.  The US first built a permanent inspection station at the border in 1937.  That brick veneer roadside border station was replaced by a wooden structure in 1981, and that facility was replaced by a large modern border station using Recovery Act funds in 2011.  Canada last replaced its border station in 1973.

See also 
 List of Canada–United States border crossings

References 

Canada–United States border crossings
Geography of Saskatchewan
1930 establishments in North Dakota
1930 establishments in Saskatchewan
Buildings and structures in Renville County, North Dakota